Michele Currarino (born 6 August 1992) is an Italian footballer who plays as a midfielder for  club Fiorenzuola.

Club career
He made his Serie B debut for Virtus Entella on 9 December 2017 in a game against Ascoli.

On 6 January 2021, he signed a 1.5-year contract with Monopoli.

On 26 August 2021, he joined to Fiorenzuola.

References

External links
 
 

1992 births
Living people
Sportspeople from the Province of La Spezia
Footballers from Liguria
Italian footballers
Association football midfielders
Serie B players
Serie C players
Serie D players
Virtus Entella players
U.S.D. Lavagnese 1919 players
S.S. Monopoli 1966 players
U.S. Fiorenzuola 1922 S.S. players